Hero shrines are religious buildings used in Chinese hero cults. They are a kind of Ci Shrine, which is a separate building built to praise the spirit of loyalty and righteousness, and to memorialize the martyrs who died for the country. In addition to shrines dedicated to martyrs and loyal subjects, some of them are converted from other buildings, such as Shinto shrines. Since Confucianism advocates the virtues of Loyalty and righteousness, the construction of the Temple not only commemorates and enshrines the martyrs who martyred the country, but also serves the purpose of moral education.

History 
In China, there were ancestral shrines dedicated to loyal subjects and martyrs, and the names of the shrines were given by Emperor. The Fayuan Temple in Beijing was built by Emperor Taizong of Tang to commemorate the martyrs who died in the Eastern Expedition Goguryeo, and was originally called Jienzhongsa Temple, but was renamed Fayuan Temple in Qing dynasty.

This practice of building shrines to honor loyal and martyred soldiers and then having them named by the Monarch also spread to other regions in the Chinese cultural sphere such as the Korean Peninsula and Vietnam. After the end of the monarchy in these areas, the hero shrines were installed by the government.

Hero shrines in various places

Mainland China 

According to the statistics of the Ministry of the Interior of the Republic of China in 1942, more than 600 counties and cities in mainland China had already set up loyalty shrines, mostly consisting of the old Confucius Temple, Guandi Temple, City God Temple, Dongyue Temple, and even , Wuhou Temple, and other temples with small temples attached to them for worship. The Capital Loyalty Shrine could not be built because of the war against Japan, even before the Nationalist government moved to Taiwan.

Although there were many martyrs' shrines built in China, some collapsed due to disrepair and others were destroyed during the Cultural Revolution.
 Nanyue Loyalty Shrine: Located in Hunan Hengyang, completed on July 7, 1943, it is one of the earliest and largest anti-Japanese war memorial sites in China.；
 It was built in 1939 to commemorate those who died during the Battle of Changsha, and the tomb of the fallen soldiers of the Seventy-third Army, built in 1946, is located in the mountain behind the Ancestral Hall.
 Tengchong Loyalty Ancestral Hall: located in Yunnan in Tengchong County in the National Cemetery of Shame, completed on July 7, 1945, dedicated to the fallen soldiers of the 20th Group of the Chinese Expeditionary Army in the battle of Tengchong during the War of Resistance against Japan.
 Shangcheng Loyalty Ancestral Hall: Located in the southeastern suburb of Shangcheng County, Henan Province, it was completed on July 7, 1943 and is dedicated to the fallen soldiers of the 84th Army during the War of Resistance against Japan.。

The ancient martyrs are: Xinzhou Loyalty Ancestral Hall in Shanxi Province, Xinzhou, Lujiazhuang Village, founded in an unknown date, dedicated to Gongsun Pestle and Mortar of the Jin Kingdom in the Spring and Autumn period。The Zhou Wang Temple in Wuxi Yixing, Jiangsu Province, is dedicated to Zhou Di, a Jin Dynasty general who died in the Jinxi expedition.

Taiwan 

Most of the existing shrines were originally converted from shrines in Japanese era after the war by the Nationalist government, and are dedicated to officers, soldiers, police and people who died in the line of duty for the Republic of China and have their significant loyalty deeds. Shrine

In accordance with the "Rules for the Sacrifice of Martyrs' Shrines" promulgated by the Ministry of the Interior of the R.O.C., Martyrs' Shrines are located at the seats of municipal governments in city and county. The National Revolutionary Martyrs' Shrine is set up at the seat of the central government, and the President officiates at the shrine.

Following a 1998 legal amendment, people who were not affiliated with the military could be inducted into the shrine. Several police officers and firefighters who have died in the line of duty have also been commemorated at the shrine, including Yang Chi-chang, who died in the Taiwan McDonald's bombings. Healthcare workers on duty during the Hoping Hospital lockdown of the 2003 SARS outbreak have also been inducted. Wen Yung-nan, who died in 1973 while delivering mail in the aftermath of Typhoon Nora, was the first postal worker to be inducted.

Korean Peninsula 
The Korean Peninsula also has a number of shrines dedicated to martyrs who died during the Incarnate Japanese Rebellion, such as Song Sang-hyeon, the Busan Chungyeolsa dedicated to General Jung dial, the Busan Chungyeolsa dedicated to General Lee Sun-sin, the Lord of Chungmu, the Korea under Japanese rule, the Korea under Japanese rule, and the Korea. Korea's head of state, patriots, and martyrs, such as the Seoul National Cemetery in Tongjak-dong, Tongjak-gu, Seoul.

Vietnam 
Influenced by Confucianism, which originated in China, Vietnam also has a number of loyalty shrines. The Martial temple in Hanoi city Dong Dao county, a temple in the Vietnamese area of the Temple of Literature, is a Martial temple of the post-Li dynasty, built in 1685, and dedicated to famous generals of the Vietnamese dynasty. During the Nguyen dynasty, Nguyễn Tri Phương French Armed Forces, the officer who sacrificed himself against the invasion of the city, was also enshrined in the temple, along with Nguyen Linh, Truong Quoc Duy, Hoang Duy, Duan Thieu and Nguyen Gao. The Martyr's Shrine is dedicated to the fallen soldiers during the Vietnam War.

Japan 
Japan set up Shōkonsha during the Imperial era to enshrine the spirits of those who donated their lives to the country, and after the war they were all renamed Gokoku Shrines except for Tokyo Shrine, which was renamed Yasukuni Shrine. The shrine is often considered to be a symbol of Japanese militarism. The shrine lists the names, origins, birthdates, and places of death of 2,466,532 men, women, children, and various pet animals. Among those are 1,068 convicted war criminals, 14 of whom are A-Class (convicted of having been involved in the planning, preparation, initiation, or waging of the war). This has led to many controversies surrounding the shrine.

Outside of the Kanji cultural sphere 
Some overseas Chinese in the Hanji cultural sphere have also built martyrdom shrines in their hometowns, such as the Tangwo Martyrdom Shrine in Tangwo Village, Chiang Mai Province, Thailand, which was built by local Chinese to worship the fallen soldiers of the Lone Army of Northern Thailand Third Army. The shrine is dedicated to the fallen soldiers and sages of the Third Army of the Kuomintang in Burma
。

See also 
 Martial temple and Wen Wu temple
 National Revolutionary Martyrs' Shrine
 Eternal Spring Shrine and Temple of Evergreen
 Chinese Cultural Renaissance
 Ancestral shrine
 Gallant Garden
 Guardian Shrine
 Tomb of the Unknown Soldier
 Arlington National Cemetery
 Valhalla (home to the souls of fallen warriors in Scandinavian mythology)
 Valhalla Shrine (a hall of fame in Germany honoring "commendable and honorable Germans")
 Heroic Martyrs Shrine
 Eternal Spring Shrine
 The common end of myriad good deeds
 Greek hero cult

References

Pages with unreviewed translations
Heroic Martyrs Shrine
Traditional sacrificial buildings in East Asia
Ci Shrines
Traditional East Asian Architecture
Military cemeteries
Religious Confucianism